Gmina Kamień is a rural gmina (administrative district) in Chełm County, Lublin Voivodeship, in eastern Poland.

Villages
Gmina Kamień contains the villages and settlements of Andrzejów, Czerniejów, Haliczany, Ignatów, Ignatów-Kolonia, Józefin, Kamień, Kamień-Kolonia, Koczów, Majdan Pławanicki, Mołodutyn, Natalin, Pławanice, Pławanice-Kolonia, Rudolfin, Strachosław and Wolawce.

Neighbouring gminas
Gmina Kamień is bordered by the gminas of Chełm, Dorohusk, Leśniowice and Żmudź.

External links
Polish official population figures 2006

Kamien
Chełm County